The Generic Universal RolePlaying System, or GURPS, is a tabletop role-playing game system designed to allow for play in any game setting. It was created by Steve Jackson Games and first published in 1986 at a time when most such systems were story- or genre-specific.

Players control their in-game characters verbally and the success of their actions is determined by the skill of their character, the difficulty of the action, and the rolling of dice. Characters earn points during play which are used to gain greater abilities. Gaming sessions are story-told and run by "Game Masters" (often referred to as simply "GMs").

GURPS won the Origins Award for Best Roleplaying Rules of 1988, and in 2000 it was inducted into the Origins Hall of Fame. Many of its expansions have also won awards.

History

Prior RPG history
Prior to GURPS, most roleplaying games (RPGs) of the 1970s and early 1980s were developed especially for certain gaming environments, and they were largely incompatible with one another. For example, TSR published its Dungeons & Dragons game specifically for a fantasy environment. Another game from the same company, Star Frontiers, was developed for science fiction–based role-playing. TSR produced other games for other environments, such as Gamma World (post-apocalyptic adventures), Top Secret (spies and secret agents), Gangbusters (Roaring Twenties adventures), and Boot Hill (American Old West). Each of these games was set with its own self-contained rules system, and the rules for playing each game differed greatly from one game to the next. Attempts were made in Advanced Dungeons and Dragons to allow cross-genre games using Gamma World and Boot Hill rules; however, characters could only be used in a new genre by converting their statistics. Although GURPS was preceded by Basic Role-Playing (Chaosium, 1980) and the Hero System (Hero Games, a system that expanded to multiple genres starting in 1982), GURPS was the most commercially successful generic role-playing game system to allow players to role-play in any environment they please while still using the same set of core rules. This flexibility of environment is greatly aided by the use of technology levels (or "tech-levels") that allow a campaign to be set from the Stone Age (TL-0) to the Digital Age (TL-8) or beyond.

The GURPS concept
Role-playing games of the 1970s and 1980s, such as Dungeons & Dragons, generally used random numbers generated by dice rolls to assign statistics to player characters. In 1978, Steve Jackson designed a new character generation system for the microgames Melee and Wizard that used a point-buy system: players are given a fixed number of points with which to buy abilities. (The Hero System first used by the Champions role-playing game published two years later also used a point-buy system.)

GURPS' emphasis on its generic aspect has proven to be a successful marketing tactic, as many game series have source engines which can be retrofitted to many styles. Its approach to versatility includes using real world measurements wherever possible ("reality-checking" is an important part of any GURPS book).

GURPS also benefits from the many dozens of worldbooks describing settings or additional rules in all genres including science fiction, fantasy, and historical. Many game designers began their professional careers as GURPS writers, including C. J. Carella, Robin Laws, S. John Ross, and  Steffan O'Sullivan.

GURPS history

The immediate mechanical antecedents of GURPS were Steve Jackson's microgames Melee and Wizard, both published by Metagaming Concepts, which eventually combined them along with another Jackson game, In the Labyrinth, to form The Fantasy Trip (TFT), an early role-playing game. Several of the core concepts of GURPS first appeared in TFT, including the inclusion of Strength, Dexterity and Intelligence as the core abilities scores of each character.

By April 1984, the core rules for GURPS (at that point referred to as the "Great Unnamed Universal Role-Playing System") was being playtested in preparation for a GURPS question-and-answer seminar at Origins 1984 in Dallas. The combat system for GURPS was published in 1985 as Man to Man: Fantasy Combat from GURPS to meet the deadline for Origins 1985 and was followed up later that year by the adventure supplement Orcslayer.

The Basic GURPS set was published in 1986 and 1987 and included two booklets, one for developing characters and one for Adventuring.

In 1990 GURPS intersected part of the hacker subculture when the company's Austin, Texas, offices were raided by the Secret Service. The target was the author of GURPS Cyberpunk in relation to E911 Emergency Response system documents stolen from Bell South. The incident was a direct contributor to the founding of the Electronic Frontier Foundation. A common misconception holds that this raid was part of Operation Sundevil and carried out by the FBI. Operation: Sundevil was in action at the same time, but it was completely separate.  See Steve Jackson Games, Inc. v. United States Secret Service.

The 1995 supplement GURPS Illuminati University introduced Agatha Heterodyne, the character who would go on to star in the popular comic series Girl Genius in 2001.

A free PDF version of the GURPS rules was released in 1998 as GURPS Lite.  This limited ruleset was also included with various books such as GURPS Discworld and Transhuman Space.

Steve Jackson Games released GURPS Fourth Edition at the first day of Gen Con on August 19, 2004. It promised to simplify and streamline most areas of play and character creation. The changes include modification of the attribute point adjustments, an edited and rationalized skill list, clarification of the differences between abilities from experience and from inborn talent, more detailed language rules, and revised technology levels. Designed by Sean Punch, the Fourth Edition is sold as two full-color hardcover books as well as in the PDF format.

Mechanics of the game

Character points
A character in GURPS is built with character points. For a beginning character in an average power game, the 4th edition suggests 100–150 points to modify attribute stats, select advantages and disadvantages, and purchase levels in skills. Normal NPCs are built on 25–50 points. Full-fledged heroes usually have 150–250 points, while superheroes are commonly built with 400–800 points. The highest point value recorded for a canon character in a GURPS sourcebook is 10,452 for the Harvester (p. 88) in GURPS Monsters.

In principle, a Game Master can balance the power of foes to the abilities of the player characters by comparing their relative point values.

Attributes
Characters in GURPS have four basic attributes:

 Strength (ST): A measure of the character's physical power and bulk, ability to lift, carry, and do damage
 Dexterity (DX): A measure of the character's physical agility, coordination, and manual dexterity
 Intelligence (IQ): A measure of the character's mental capacity, acuity and sense of the world
 Health (HT): A measure of the character's physical stamina, recovery speed, energy and vitality, ability to resist disease

Each attribute has a number rating assigned to it. Normally they begin at 10, representing typical human ability, but can go as low as 1 for nearly useless, to 20 (or higher) for superhuman power. Anything in the 8 to 12 range is considered to be in the normal or average area for humans. Basic attribute scores of 6 or less are considered crippling—they are so far below the human norm that they are only used for severely handicapped characters. Scores of 15 or more are described as amazing—they are immediately apparent and draw constant comment.

Players assign these ratings spending character points. The higher the rating the more points it will cost the player, however, assigning a score below the average 10 gives the player points back to assign elsewhere.  Since almost all skills are based on Dexterity or Intelligence, those attributes are twice as expensive (or yield twice the points, if purchased below 10). In earlier editions (pre–4th Edition) all attributes followed the same cost-progression, where higher attributes cost more per increase than attributes close to the average of 10.

Attribute scores also determine several secondary characteristics. The four major ones are each directly based on a single attribute:

Hit Points (HP): how much damage and injury can be sustained, based on ST in 4e. In previous editions it was based on HT.
Will (Will): mental focus and strength, withstanding stress, based on IQ.
Perception (Per): general sensory alertness, based on IQ.
Fatigue Points (FP): a measure of exertion, tiredness, and hunger, based on HT in 4e. In previous editions it was based on ST.

The other secondary characteristics (Damage, Basic Lift, Basic Speed, Dodge, Move) are calculated from one or more attribute values using individual tables or formulae.

Character advantages and disadvantages 
GURPS has a profusion of advantages and disadvantages which enable players or Game Masters to customize their characters. The myriad options available and the rewards the system provides players for carefully creating their characters are attractive to gamers who enjoy a high degree of flexibility in character design.

A player can select numerous Advantages and Disadvantages to differentiate the character; the system supports both mundane traits (such as above-average or below-average Wealth, Status and Reputation) as well as more exotic special abilities and weaknesses. These are categorized as physical, mental or social, and as exotic, supernatural, or mundane. Advantages benefit the character and cost points to purchase. Selecting Disadvantages returns character points and allows players to limit their characters in one way in exchange for being more powerful or gifted in other areas. Disadvantages include such positive attributes as honesty and truthfulness which limit the way a character is played. There are also many Perks and Quirks to choose from which give a character some personality. Perks (minor Advantages) and Quirks (minor Disadvantages) benefit or hinder the character a bit, but they mostly add role-playing flavor.

Enhancements and limitations can tailor an advantage or disadvantage to suit creative players. These modify the effects and point cost of advantages and disadvantages. For example, to create a "dragon's breath" attack, a player would select the Innate Attack ability (the ability that allows a player to perform an attack most humans could not), and select burning attack 4D (normally 20 points). Then, the player would modify it as follows: cone, 5 yards (+100%); limited use, 3/day (-20%); reduced range, x1/5 (-20%). The final percentage modifier would be +60%, making the final cost 32 points. This addition to the system greatly increases its flexibility while decreasing the number of specific advantages and disadvantages that must be listed. Finally, mitigators can themselves tailor advantages and disadvantages (see GURPS Bio-Tech for such an example).

Skills
GURPS has a wide variety of skills intended to enable it to support any conceivable genre (such as Acrobatics and Vehicle Piloting). Each skill is tied to at least one attribute, and the characters' abilities in that skill is a function of their base attributes + or - a certain amount.

The availability of skills depends on the particular genre in which the GURPS game is played. For instance, in a generic medieval fantasy setting, skills for operating a computer or flying a fighter jet would not normally be available. Skills are rated by level, and the more levels purchased with character points, the better the characters are at that particular skill relative to their base attribute.

Skills are categorized by difficulty: Easy, Average, Hard, and Very Hard. Easy skills cost few points to purchase levels in, and the cost per skill level increases with each level of difficulty.  Game mechanics allow that eventually it may be less expensive to raise the level of the base attribute the skills depend on as opposed to purchasing higher levels of skills.  Players can generally purchase a skill for their characters at any level they can afford.  The lower a player chooses, the fewer points it costs to buy the skill, while higher levels cost more points. Some skills have default levels, which indicate the level rating a character has when using that skill untrained (i.e. not purchased). For example, a character with a Dexterity of 12, is using the Climbing skill untrained. Climbing has a default of DX-5 or ST-5, which means that using the skill untrained gives him a Climbing skill level of 7 (12-5) if he tied it to the Dexterity stat. If the character had a higher Strength stat, he could have a better chance of success if he tied the Climbing skill there instead.

Some skills also have a Tech Level (TL) rating attached to them, to differentiate between Skills that concern similar concepts, but whose tasks are accomplished in different ways when used with differing levels of technology. This helps during time traveling scenarios, or when characters are forced to deal with particularly outdated or advanced equipment. For instance, a modern boat builder's skills will be of less use if he is stuck on a desert island and forced to work with primitive tools and techniques. Thus, the skills he uses are different when in his shop (Shipbuilding/TL8) and when he is on the island (Shipbuilding/TL0).

Success rolls
GURPS uses six-sided dice for all game mechanics using standard dice notation. An "average roll" of three six sided dice generates a total of 10.5; this makes an "average" skill check (a skill of 10, based on an unmodified attribute) equally likely to succeed or fail.

Making statistic and skill checks in GURPS is the reverse of the mechanics of most other RPGs, where the higher the total of the die roll, the better. GURPS players hope to roll as low as possible under the tested statistic's rating or skill's level. If the roll is less than or equal to that number, the check succeeds. There is no "target number" or "difficulty rating" set by the Game Master, as would be the case in many other RPG systems. Instead the GM will apply various modifiers to add or subtract to the skill level. In this way, positive modifiers increase the chance for success by adding to the stat or skill level the player must roll under while negative modifiers deduct from it, making things more difficult.

For example: a player makes a pick pocketing test for her character. The character has a Pickpocket skill with a level of 11. Under normal circumstances - i.e., under an average stressful situation, according to the manual - the player must roll an 11 or less for the character to succeed. If the player rolls above 11, then the character has failed the attempt at pick pocketing.

There are some exceptions for very high or low rolls, deemed criticals. No matter the level of the skill, a die roll of 18 is always a critical failure, and a roll of 3 or 4 is always a critical success (a roll of 17 is a critical failure as well, unless the character relevant skill level is 16 or more). The Game Master may decide in such cases that, in first case (a roll of 18, or 10+ over the modified skill level), the character has failed miserably and caused something disastrous to happen or, in the other case, that he or she succeeds incredibly well and gains some benefit as a result.

Combat
Combat in GURPS is organized in personal turns: i.e., every character gets a turn each second, and during a character's turn he or she may take an action, such as attack or move. After all characters have taken their action, one second has elapsed. Free actions are simple actions that can be done at any time. Characters in a party have a set initiative that is entirely based upon their Basic Speed characteristic.

There are two kinds of attacks: Melee (possibly with hand-to-hand weapons, or unarmed combat) and Ranged (bows, guns, thrown weapons, some Innate Attacks, etc.). Attacks made by a character are checked against their skill with the particular weapon they carry. For instance, if a character is using a pistol, as with any other skill, it is beneficial to have a high level in the Guns skill. Like any other skill check, a player must roll equal to or less than the level of the skill to succeed. Failure means a miss, success scores a hit. Similarly, critical hits mean that the blow might inflict significantly more damage to its target; critical misses may lead to a rather unpleasant and unexpected event (such as dropping the weapon or hitting the wrong target). Attack modifiers are set by the GM when factoring in things like distance, speed and cover that make a successful strike more difficult.

After a successful attack, except in the case of a critical hit, the defender usually gets a chance to avoid the blow.  This is called an Active Defense, and takes the form of a Dodge (deliberate movement out of the perceived path of the attack), Parry (attempt to deflect or intercept the attack with a limb or weapon), or Block (effort to interpose a shield or similar object between the attack and the defender's body).  Unlike many RPG systems, an Active Defense is an unopposed check, meaning that in most cases, the success of an attack has no effect on the difficulty of the defense.  Dodge is based on the Basic Speed characteristic, while Parry and Block are each based on individual combat skills, such as Fencing, Karate, or Staff for Parry, and Shield or Cloak for Block. A common criticism is that characters can achieve a relatively high Active Defense value, drawing out fights considerably. The only mechanic within the system to address this is the Feint action, which if successful will place the adversary in an unfavorable position, reducing their active defense against that character only, on the subsequent turn.

Certain skills, attributes and equipment, when strung together, can be used to great effect. Let us say a gunslinger from the Old West is facing a foe; he can use the Combat Reflexes ability to react before his enemy, the Fast-Draw(Pistol) skill to get his two guns out, the Gunslinger ability to allow him to skip the aiming step, and the Dual-Weapon Attack(Pistol) skill to fire both his guns at once. This would have taken around 6 turns, if he had none of these skills.

Damage and defenses
Damage from muscle-powered weapons, (clubs, swords, bows, etc.) is calculated based on the character's ST rating. The weaker a character is physically, the less damage he or she is capable of inflicting with such a weapon. Purely mechanical weapons (guns, beam sabers, bombs, etc.) have a set damage value.

When damage is inflicted upon characters, it is deducted from their Hit Points, which are calculated with the Strength stat (prior to GURPS 4th Edition, Hit Points were derived from the Health stat). Like most other RPGs, a loss of hit points indicates physical harm being inflicted upon a character, which can potentially lead to death. GURPS calculates shock penalties when someone is hit, representing the impact it causes and the rush of pain that interferes with concentration. Different weapons can cause different 'types' of damage, ranging from crushing (a club or mace), impaling (a spear or arrow), cutting (most swords and axes), piercing (bullets), and so on.

One peculiarity about loss of Hit Points is that in GURPS, death is not certain. While a very high amount of total HP loss will cause certain death, there are also several points at which a player must successfully roll HT, with different grades of failure indicating character death or a mortal injury.

Depending on the nature of the attack, there will sometimes be additional effects.

Advancement
Character advancement follows the same system as character creation. Characters are awarded character points to improve themselves at regular intervals (usually at the end of a game session or story).

GMs are free to distribute experience as they see fit. This contrasts with some traditional RPGs where players receive a predictable amount of experience for defeating foes. The book recommends providing 1-3 points for completing objectives and 1-3 points for good role-playing per game session.

Advancement can also come through study, work, or other activities, either during game play or between sessions. In general, 200 hours of study equals one character point which can be applied for the area being studied. Self-study and on the job experience take more time per character point while high tech teaching aids can reduce the time required.

Some intensive situations let a character advance quickly, as most waking hours are considered study. For instance, characters travelling through the Amazon may count every waking moment as study of jungle survival, while living in a foreign country could count as eight hours per day of language study or more.

Licensed works
The computer game publisher Interplay licensed GURPS as the basis for a post–nuclear war role-playing video game (Fallout) in 1995.  Late in development, Interplay replaced the GURPS character-building system with their own SPECIAL System.  According to Steve Jackson, "The statement on the Interplay web site, to the effect that this was a mutual decision of SJ Games and Interplay, is not true.  ...  We are not clear what their proposal to finish and release the game without the [GURPS] license entails, for us or for the game, and have absolutely not agreed to it."  Brian Fargo, one of the executive producers of Fallout, stated during an interview that Interplay dropped out of the licensing deal, following fundamental disagreements on the game's content. "[Steve Jackson] was offended by the nature of the content and where it was going. ... He saw [the opening cinematic], and he just wouldn't approve it."

GURPS For Dummies, a guidebook by Stuart J. Stuple, Bjoern-Erik Hartsfvang, and Adam Griffith, was published in 2006.

Reception
Marcus L. Rowland reviewed GURPS in 1986 for White Dwarf #83, and stated that "While I can applaud the idea behind the system, I can't really recommend GURPS at its present stage of development. In the long run, GURPS and all its supplements may cover more ground than other systems, possibly at less expense, but in the short term there isn't enough support material to run a fully rounded game of any type, apart from gladiatorial combat and medieval adventures."

The Games Machine reviewed GURPS and stated that "If the idea of a generic system appeals, or you want a straightforward set of rules with which to run adventures in a setting of your own making, GURPS is worth a look."

GURPS was ranked 14th in the 1996 reader poll of Arcane magazine to determine the 50 most popular roleplaying games of all time.  The UK magazine's editor Paul Pettengale commented: "Based around a points system and six-sided dice, GURPS succeeds better than most 'generic' games. The rules are flexible and it's well supported – regardless of what you want to do with it, you'll probably find a supplement with some advice and background. The game suffers from being a little too detailed at times, and can get bogged down in numbers. Still, it's an adaptable system with some superb supplements."

Reviews
Adventurer (Issue 6 - Jan 1986)
 Casus Belli #70 (July 1992)
 Casus Belli #71 (Sep 1992)

See also
 List of GURPS books
 GURPS Basic Set
 Pyramid, a monthly online magazine with GURPS support

References

 Review of the French translation

External links

 
Steve Jackson (American game designer) games
Universal role-playing games
Origins Award winners
Steve Jackson Games games
Role-playing games introduced in 1986